

Events 
 January–March 
 January 9 – The North Carolina General Assembly authorizes nine commissioners to purchase  of land for the seat of Chatham County. The town is named Pittsborough (later shortened to Pittsboro), for William Pitt the Younger.
 January 11 – William Herschel discovers Titania and Oberon, two moons of Uranus.
 January 19 – Mozart's Symphony No. 38 is premièred in Prague.
 February 2 – Arthur St. Clair of Pennsylvania is chosen as the new President of the Congress of the Confederation.
 February 4 – Shays' Rebellion in Massachusetts fails.
 February 21 – The Confederation Congress sends word to the 13 states that a convention will be held in Philadelphia on May 14 to revise the Articles of Confederation.
 February 28 – A charter is granted, establishing the institution which will become the University of Pittsburgh.
 March 3 – By a vote of 33 to 29, Harrisburg is approved as the new capital of the Commonwealth of Pennsylvania.
 March 17 – The Bank of North America, the central bank of the United States government under the Articles of Confederation, is re-incorporated after its charter had expired in 1786.Congressional Record (December 8, 1913) p446
 March 28 – In the British House of Commons, Henry Beaufoy files the first motion to repeal the Test Act 1673, which restricts the rights of non-members of the Church of England.; Beaufoy's motion is rejected, and the Act is not repealed until 1829.  
 March 30 – Biblical theology becomes a separate discipline from biblical studies, as Johann Philipp Gabler delivers his speech "On the proper distinction between biblical and dogmatic theology and the specific objectives of each" upon his inauguration as the professor of theology at the University of Altdorf in Germany.

 April–June 
 April 2 – A Charter of Justice is signed, providing the authority for the establishment of the first New South Wales (i.e. Australian) Courts of Criminal and Civil Jurisdiction.
 May 7 – The New Church (Swedenborgian) is founded in England.
 May 13 – Captain Arthur Phillip leaves Portsmouth, England, with the 11 ships of the First Fleet, carrying around 700 convicts and at least 300 crew and guards to establish a penal colony in Australia.
 May 14 – In Philadelphia, delegates begin arriving for a Constitutional Convention.
 May 22 – In Britain, Thomas Clarkson and Granville Sharp found the Society for Effecting the Abolition of the Slave Trade, with support from John Wesley, Josiah Wedgwood and others.
 May 25 – In Philadelphia, delegates begin to convene the Constitutional Convention, intended to amend the Articles of Confederation (however, a new United States Constitution is eventually produced). George Washington presides over the Convention.
 May – Orangist troops attack Vreeswijk, Harmelen and Maarssen; civil war starts in the Dutch Republic.
 May 31 – The original Lord's Cricket Ground in London holds its first cricket match; Marylebone Cricket Club founded.
 June 20 – Oliver Ellsworth moves at the Federal Convention that the government be called the United States.
 June 28 – Princess Wilhelmina of Orange, sister of King Frederick William II of Prussia, is captured by Dutch Republican patriots, taken to Goejanverwellesluis and not allowed to travel to The Hague.

 July–September 
 July 13 – The Congress of the Confederation enacts the Northwest Ordinance, establishing governing rules for the Northwest Territory (the future states of Ohio, Indiana, Illinois, Michigan and Wisconsin). It also establishes procedures for the admission of new states, and limits the expansion of slavery.
 July 18 – The United States ratifies its first treaty with the Sultanate of Morocco.
 August 9 – South Carolina cedes to the United States its claims to a 12-mile wide strip of land that runs across northern Alabama and Mississippi. 
 August 27 – Launching a  steam powered craft on the Delaware River, John Fitch demonstrates the first U.S. patent for his design.
 September 13 – Prussian troops invade the Dutch Republic. Within a few weeks 40,000 Patriots (out of a population of 2,000,000) go into exile in France (and learn from observation the ideals of the French Revolution).
 September 17 – The United States Constitution is signed by the Constitutional Convention in Philadelphia.
 September 24 – Washington Academy (later Washington & Jefferson College) is chartered by the Pennsylvania General Assembly.

 October–December 
 October 1 – Russo-Turkish War (1787–92) – Battle of Kinburn: Alexander Suvorov, though sustaining a wound, routs the Turks.
 October 27 – The first of The Federalist Papers, a series of essays calling for ratification of the U.S. Constitution, is published in The Independent Journal, a New York newspaper.
 October 29 – Wolfgang Amadeus Mozart's opera Don Giovanni (libretto by Lorenzo Da Ponte) premieres in the Estates Theatre in Prague.
 November 1 – The first secondary education school open to girls in Sweden, Societetsskolan, is founded in Gothenburg.
 November 21 – Treaty of Versailles (1787) signed, forming an alliance between the Kingdom of France and the Lord Nguyễn Phúc Ánh, future Emperor of Vietnam.
 December 3 – James Rumsey demonstrates his water-jet propelled boat on the Potomac River.
 December 7 – Delaware ratifies the Constitution, and becomes the first U.S. state.
 December 8 – La Purisima Mission is founded by Padre Fermín Lasuén as the eleventh of the Spanish missions in California.
 December 12 – Pennsylvania becomes the second U.S. state.
 December 18 – New Jersey becomes the third U.S. state.

 Date unknown 
 Caroline Herschel is granted an annual salary of £50, by King George III of Great Britain, for acting as assistant to her brother William in astronomy.
 The North Carolina General Assembly incorporates Waynesborough, and designates it the seat for Wayne County, North Carolina.
 Antoine Lavoisier is the first to suggest that silica is an oxide of a hitherto unknown metallic chemical element, later isolated and named silicon.
 Freed slave Ottobah Cugoano publishes Thoughts and Sentiments on the Evil and Wicked Traffic of the Slavery and Commerce of the Human Species in England.
 J. Cl. Todes Døtreskole, the first serious school for girls in Denmark, is founded.
A fossil bone recovered from Cretaceous strata at Woodbury, New Jersey is discussed by the American Philosophical Society in Philadelphia.

Births 

 January 1 – Manuel José Arce, Revolutionary General and first President of The Federal Republic of Central America (d. 1847)
 February 10 – William Bradley, Britain's tallest man ever at 7 ft 9 in. (d. 1820)
 February 23 – Emma Willard, American educator (d. 1870)
 March 6 – Joseph von Fraunhofer, German optician (d. 1826)
 March 7 – George Bethune English, American explorer and writer (d. 1828)
 March 9 - Josephine Kablick, Czech botanist, paleontologist (d. 1863)
 March 10 – Francisco de Paula Martínez de la Rosa y Berdejo, Prime Minister of Spain (d. 1862)
 March 11 – Ivan Nabokov, Russian General (d. 1852)
 April 26 – Ludwig Uhland, German poet (d. 1862)
 May 25 – José María Bocanegra, 3rd President of Mexico (d. 1862)
 June 28 – Sir Harry Smith, English soldier, military commander (d. 1860)
 July 28 – Pedro Vélez, Mexican politician (d. 1848)
 August 24 – James Weddell, British sailor known for discovering the Weddell Sea (d. 1834) 
 September 5 – François Sulpice Beudant, French mineralogist, geologist (d. 1850)
 October 4, – François Guizot, Prime Minister of France (d. 1874)
 November 4 – Edmund Kean, English actor (d. 1833)
 November 7
 Carl Carl, Polish-born actor and theatre director (d. 1854)
 Vuk Stefanović Karadžić, Serbian linguist, major reformer of the Serbian language (d. 1864)

 November 18 – Louis Daguerre, French artist, chemist (d. 1851)
 November 21 – Samuel Cunard, Canadian business, prominent Nova Scotian, founder of the Cunard Line (d. 1865)
 November 25 – Franz Xaver Gruber, Austrian composer (d. 1863) 
 December 10 – Thomas Hopkins Gallaudet, American educator (d. 1851)
 December 11 – Macacha Güemes, Argentine heroine (d. 1866)
 December 16 – Mary Russell Mitford, English novelist and dramatist (d. 1855)
 December 17 – Jan Evangelista Purkyne, Czech anatomist, botanist (d. 1869)

Date unknown
 Juana Galán, Spanish heroine (d. 1812)
 Shaka, Zulu king (d. 1828)

Deaths 
 January 1 – Arthur Middleton, American politician (b. 1742)
 January 4 – Prince Joseph of Saxe-Hildburghausen, German prince (b. 1702)
 February 2 – Ignác Raab, Czech artist (b. 1715)
 February 5 – Hugh Farmer, British theologian (b. 1714)
 February 4 – Pompeo Batoni, Italian painter (b. 1708)

 February 13
 Rudjer Boscovich, Croatian scientist, diplomat (b. 1711)
 Charles Gravier, comte de Vergennes, French statesman, diplomat (b. 1717)
 February 21 – Antonio Rodríguez de Hita, Spanish composer (b. 1722)
 February 28 – Princess Ulrike Friederike Wilhelmine of Hesse-Kassel, German princess (b. 1722)
 March 8 – Samuel Graves, British Royal Navy admiral (b. 1713)
 March 22 – Charles de Fitz-James, Marshal of France (b. 1712)
 April 2 – Thomas Gage, British general (b. 1719)
 May 10 – William Watson, English physician, scientist (b. 1715)
 May 26 – Lord John Murray, British politician (b. 1711)
 May 28 – Leopold Mozart, Austrian composer (b. 1719)
 May 31 – Felix of Nicosia, Cypriot Catholic saint (b. 1715)
 June 10 – La Caramba (Maria Antonia Fernandez), Spanish flamenco singer and dancer (b. 1751)
 June 14 – Johann Georg Dominicus von Linprun, German scientist (b. 1714)
 June 17 – José de Gálvez, Spanish politician (b. 1720)
 June 20 – Carl Friedrich Abel, German composer (b. 1723)
 July 4 – Charles, Prince of Soubise, Marshal of France (b. 1715)
 July 25 – Arthur Devis, British artist (b. 1712)
 August 1 – Alphonsus Liguori, Italian founder of the Redemptorist Order (b. 1696)
 August 7 – Francis Blackburne, English Anglican churchman, activist (b. 1705)
 August 13 – Marc Antoine René de Voyer, French noble (b. 1722)
 August 16 – John Ponsonby (politician), Irish politician (b. 1713)
 September 7 – Carlos Fitz-James Stuart, 4th Duke of Liria and Jérica, Spanish duke (b. 1752)
 October 7 – Henry Muhlenberg, German-born founder of the U.S. Lutheran Church (b. 1711)
 October 28 – Johann Karl August Musäus, German author and collector of folk tales (b. 1735)
 November 3 – Robert Lowth, English bishop and grammarian (b. 1710)
 November 4 – Johan Daniel Berlin, Norwegian composer and organist (b. 1714)

 November 15 – Christoph Willibald Gluck, German composer (b. 1714)
 December 11 – Robert de Lamanon, French botanist (b. 1752)
 date unknown
 Maria Pellegrina Amoretti, Italian lawyer (b. 1756)
 The Two-Headed Boy of Bengal, sufferer from the rare condition Craniopagus parasiticus (b. 1783)
 Francis William Drake, British admiral and Governor of Newfoundland (b. 1724)

References 

WIKI

Further reading